The Egypt electoral list is an electoral alliance in Egypt that was established between the Egyptian Front and the Independent Current Coalition to contest the 2015 Egyptian parliamentary election.

Some candidates from the Reawakening of Egypt list as well as the Republican Alliance for Social Forces have withdrawn from their own lists and joined the Egypt list.

Affiliated parties and coalitions
 Arab Democratic Nasserist Party
 Arab Party for Justice and Equality
 Democratic Generation Party
 Democratic Peace Party
 Egyptian Arab Socialist Party
 Egyptian Patriotic Movement
 My Homeland Egypt Party
 Social Construction Party
 Tomorrow Party
 Victory Party
 Voice of Egypt Party

References

2015 establishments in Egypt
Political party alliances in Egypt
Organizations established in 2015